The first railway in Canada, the Champlain and St. Lawrence Railroad, opened near Montreal in 1836. This list includes extant and demolished stations.

Alberta

British Columbia

Island

Mainland

Manitoba

New Brunswick

Newfoundland and Labrador

Nova Scotia

Ontario

Prince Edward Island

Quebec

Saskatchewan

See also

 List of designated heritage railway stations of Canada
 List of IATA-indexed railway stations
 Station code

Bibliography 

Bohi, Charles W. and Leslie S. Kozma. Canadian Pacific's Western Depots. David City, Neb.: South Platte Press, 1993.
 Bohi, Charles W. Canadian National's Western Depots: The Country Stations in Western Canada. Don Mills, Ont.: Fitzhenry and Whiteside, 1977.
 Martin, J. Edward. The Railway Stations of Western Canada: An Architectural History. White Rock, B.C.: Studio E, 1980.

References